The Chistopolian Highflyer is a breed of fancy pigeon. Chistopolian Highflyers, along with other varieties of domesticated pigeons, are all descendants from the rock pigeon (Columba livia).

See also 
List of pigeon breeds

Pigeon breeds